Henry Durand (6 June 1861 – 8 May 1929) wrote, with Carl Wilhelm, "Bright College Years", the Yale University alma mater.

Durand was born in Cincinnati, Ohio, the son of John Durand, a railroad builder and manager, and his wife Martha Boyd Stewart Durand. He prepared for Yale at the Hopkins School. He graduated with the Yale Class of 1881 and was Class Poet.

Durand obtained a M.D. from Harvard Medical School in 1888, interned at Massachusetts General Hospital and practiced medicine in Rochester, New York. He cared for the wounded in the Mexican Revolution, marrying his wife, Harriet Blanche Robinson Best, there in 1916. He  contracted an illness in Mexico from which he recovered in Los Angeles, California from 1916 to 1923, and then lived abroad in Nice, Vienna and lastly Paris, where he died in the American Hospital from heart disease. He was buried in Mount Hope Cemetery in Rochester.

"Bright College Years" was arranged for the 1881 Yale Glee Club, and after the quelling of sentiment after World War I to find another alma mater, Durand's song has been "the unofficial alma mater that, with handkerchief accompaniment, is a standard element of Commencement, football games, and almost every alumni get-together."

In Rochester, Dr. Durand is best remembered for his summer camp in Irondequoit that abutted Lake Ontario.  He and his friend George Eastman agreed upon the desirability of a public park in the area, and collaborated in purchasing a number of farms around the Durand property. The pair offered their land to the city of Rochester on January 28, 1907 to be used as a public park.  Durand Eastman Park was formally dedicated on May 22, 1909.
To the original 484 original acres, 493 have been added over the years, bringing the current size of Durand Eastman Park to 977-acres, including Durand Lake and Eastman Lake.  Notable features of the park include the northern boundary, with approximately 5,000 feet (1,500 m) along of Lake Ontario.  There is also an 18-hole municipal golf course that was built in 1917 and later redesigned in 1933 by Robert Trent Jones.

References

1861 births
1929 deaths
Yale University alumni
Hopkins School alumni
Harvard Medical School alumni